Svengali is a character in George du Maurier's 1895 novel Trilby.

Svengali may also refer to:

Film
 Svengali (1914 film), an Austrian film starring Ferdinand Bonn
 Svengali (1927 film), directed by Gennaro Righelli and starring Paul Wegener 
 Svengali (1931 film), starring John Barrymore and Marian Marsh
 Svengali (1954 film), starring Hildegard Knef and Donald Wolfit 
 Svengali (1983 film), starring Peter O'Toole and Jodie Foster
 Svengali (2013 film), starring Jonny Owen and Vicky McClure

Music
 Dr. Svengali, manager of the band The Network
 Svengali (Gil Evans album), a 1973 release by jazz musician Gil Evans
 Svengali (Cakes da Killa album), a 2022 release by hip-hop artist Cakes da Killa
 Svengali (musical), a 1991 musical by Gregory Boyd and Frank Wildhorn

Other
 "Svengali", a song by singer-songwriter Steve Taylor, from his album I Predict 1990
Sven Gali, Canadian hard rock/glam metal band
 "Svengali", the sixth episode of Law & Order: Special Victims Unit (season 9)
 Svengali deck, a deck of cards used to perform magic tricks
 Svengali, the title of magician Derren Brown's 2011 Tour

See also
Svengoolie, a hosted horror movie television series